Kenny Burrell in New York is a live album by guitarist Kenny Burrell recorded at the Village Vanguard in late 1978 and released on the Muse label. The album was rereleased on CD along with Kenny Burrell Live at the Village Vanguard as 12-15-78.

Reception 

The Allmusic review called it a "among the finest Burrell recorded in the '70s".

Track listing 
 "Pent Up House" (Sonny Rollins) – 8:59
 "But Beautiful" (Jimmy Van Heusen, Johnny Burke) – 5:18
 "Bags' Groove" (Milt Jackson]) – 3:57
 "Makin' Whoopee" (Walter Donaldson, Gus Kahn) – 7:22
 "Come Rain or Come Shine" (Harold Arlen, Johnny Mercer) – 3:40
 "Love, Your Magic Spell is Everywhere" (Edmund Goulding, Elsie Janis) – 7:43

Personnel 
Kenny Burrell – electric guitar
Larry Gales – bass
Sherman Ferguson – drums

References 

Kenny Burrell live albums
1981 live albums
Muse Records live albums
Albums recorded at the Village Vanguard